Chantal Andere (born Jacqueline Chantal Fernández Andere; born January 25, 1972) is a Mexican actress and singer best known for her portraying as the villainess, the vamp or the bitter woman in telenovelas. She has come across as a serious actress ("Toda una profesional").

Early life and career
Andere was born to Mexican actress Jacqueline Andere (born 1938) and Argentine writer Jose Maria Fernandez Unsain (1918–1997) in Mexico City, Mexico. As a child, she studied ballet and attended acting and singing classes. Her first professional acting role came in 1983 with Polo, Pelota Amarilla. After that, she began acting in theatre and then television. Though she saw no success, Chantal embarked on her singing career. Possessing a great voice, she recorded three albums for Discos Melody, beginning with her self-titled debut in 1990 which featured her songs "Regresa" and "Virginia", followed by another self-titled album in 1992 featuring "Entre Tú y Yo" and "Contigo el Amor es Mucho Mas", and finally in 1995 with her album Tentaciones.

In 1994, Andere became popular for her character as Angélica Santibáñez, the main antagonist in Marimar starring Thalía. Andere has played various types of villainess in numerous telenovelas produced by Televisa, including Dulce Desafío, Los Parientes Pobres, El noveno mandamiento, La usurpadora, Amor real, Barrera de Amor, Destilando Amor, Sortilegio, Rafaela, and La mujer del Vendaval. In 2021, she marks her debut on Telemundo in the telenovela Parientes a la fuerza.

In 2006, she also appeared in the singing competition Cantando por un sueño alongside her partner Gerardo Urquiza. In 2020, Andere recently participated in the reality-singing competition Tu cara me suena, a TV show based on Your Face Sounds Familiar.

Personal life
She was married to producer Roberto Gómez Fernández, the son of famous Mexican comedian Roberto Gomez Bolaños. On December 6, 2006, Telefutura's Escándalo TV announced that she would be seeking a divorce from her husband. Andere married Enrique Rivero Lake in December 2008. They have a daughter and a son.

Discography
 Chantal (Regresa) 
 Chantal (Entre tú y yo) 
 Tentaciones

Selected filmography

Television

Theater
 Blanca Nieves y los siete enanos 
 La pandilla 
 Una pareja con Ángel
 Amor sin barreras
 Cabaret 
 Victor/Victoria 
 Cena de Matrimonios

Awards and nominations

Premios TVyNovelas

Premios Bravo

Premios de la Asociación de Cronistas y Periodistas Teatrales (ACPT)

References

External links

1972 births
Living people
Mexican telenovela actresses
Mexican television actresses
Mexican stage actresses
Actresses from Mexico City
Singers from Mexico City
20th-century Mexican actresses
21st-century Mexican actresses
Mexican people of Argentine descent
Mexican people of Basque descent
21st-century Mexican singers